Fábio Marcelo de Oliveira (born 6 July 1974) is a Brazilian footballer.

Career
In June 2003 he was re-signed by Xiamen.

Return to Brazil
2004
In 2004, he played for Criciúma at Campeonato Brasileiro.

2007
In June 2007 he signed for Remo. He also played for Atlético Goianiense at Copa do Brasil 2007 and Campeonato Goiano.

2008
In 2008, he signed for Fortaleza at Campeonato Brasileiro Série B. In September 2008 he signed for Paysandu at Campeonato Brasileiro Série C.

2009
In November 2008 he was signed by Madureira. In March 2009 he signed for Joinville.

In June 2009, he signed a contract until September for Gama of Campeonato Brasileiro Série C. but later released due to Gama did not enter the second stage of the league.

Honours
Campeonato Goiano: 2007

References

External links
http://futpedia.globo.com/jogadores/fabio-oliveira
 

Brazilian footballers
Brazilian expatriate footballers
Expatriate footballers in Bolivia
Expatriate footballers in China
Criciúma Esporte Clube players
Clube do Remo players
Avaí FC players
Atlético Clube Goianiense players
Fortaleza Esporte Clube players
Paysandu Sport Club players
Madureira Esporte Clube players
Footballers from Rio de Janeiro (city)
1974 births
Living people
Brazilian expatriate sportspeople in China
Brazilian expatriate sportspeople in Bolivia
Association football forwards